Mothers of the Novel: 100 Good Women Writers Before Jane Austen (1986), by Dale Spender, is a foundational study for the reclamation project central to feminist literary studies in English in the late 1980s and 1990s.

Mothers of the Novel

Part I
Mothers of the Novel is divided into three parts. Part I treats a series of seventeenth-century women writers, only some of whom would have been familiar to most readers in 1986: Aphra Behn (1640–1689), Margaret Cavendish (1623–1673), Anne Clifford (1590–1676), Anne Fanshawe (1625–1680), Eliza Haywood (1693–1756), Lucy Hutchinson (1618–1681), Delarivière Manley (1663 –1724), Katherine Philips (1631–1664), Anna Weamys (fl. 1651), and Mary Wroth (1587– 1653).

Part II
Part II includes a list of one hundred and six (106) early women novelists little-known at the time of writing, and the titles of 568 of their novels. Many of these works have since been reprinted and become subjects of academic study, though a proportion of these writers remain relatively obscure or, in some cases, unidentified.

Part III
Part III treats a series of late-eighteenth- and early-nineteenth-century writers from the list: Mary Brunton, Frances Burney, Maria Edgeworth, Sarah Fielding, Mary Hays, Elizabeth Inchbald, Charlotte Lennox, Amelia Opie, Sydney Owenson, Ann Radcliffe, Charlotte Smith, and Mary Wollstonecraft.

Mothers of the Novel series
Pandora Press released a companion "Mothers of the Novel" series of twenty novels by sixteen authors between 1986 and 1989:
Mary Brunton, Discipline (1815; repr. 1986) 
Mary Brunton, Self-control (1810/11; repr. 1986) 
Frances Burney, The Wanderer; or Female Difficulties (1814; repr. 1988) 
Maria Edgeworth, Belinda (1801; repr. 1986) 
Maria Edgeworth, Helen (1834; repr. 1987) 
Maria Edgeworth, Patronage (1814; repr. 1986) 
Eliza Fenwick, Secrecy, or The Ruin of the Rock  (1795; repr. 1988) 
Sarah Fielding, The Governess, or The Little Female Academy  (1749; repr. 1987) 
Mary Hamilton, Munster Village (1778; repr. 1987) 
Mary Hays, Memoirs of Emma Courtney (1796; repr. 1987) 
Eliza Haywood, The History of Miss Betsy Thoughtless (1751; repr. 1986) 
Elizabeth Inchbald, A Simple Story (1791; repr. 1987) 
Harriet Lee and Sophia Lee, The Canterbury Tales (1797–1805; repr. 1989) 
Charlotte Lennox, The Female Quixote, or the Adventures of Arabella (1752; repr. 1986) 
Sydney Owenson, The O’Briens and the O’Flahertys: A National Tale (1827; repr. 1988) 
Sydney Owenson, The Wild Irish Girl (1806; repr. 1986) 
Amelia Opie, Adeline Mowbray, or The Mother and Daughter (1804; repr. 1986) 
Frances Sheridan, Memoirs of Miss Sidney Bidulph (1761; repr. 1987) 
Charlotte Smith, Emmeline: The Orphan of the Castle (1788; repr. 1989)  
Charlotte Smith, The Old Manor House  (1793; repr. 1987)

See also
List of early-modern British women novelists
List of Minerva Press authors
Women's writing (literary category)

Notes

Further reading
Spedding, Patrick. Pandora Press "Mothers of the Novel" series
Stanton, Judith Phillips. Review. Signs, vol. 12, no. 4, 1987, pp. 801–04. JSTOR, http://www.jstor.org/stable/3174215. Accessed 19 Sep. 2022.

External links

Library Thing 218085
Goodreads 830476

1986 non-fiction books
Books about writers
Literary criticism
Feminist criticism
English-language literature
Feminist fiction
Feminist literature
 
 
History of literature
Literary theory
 
Women's studies